Kym Greeley (born 1973) is a Canadian painter based in St. John's, Newfoundland and Labrador, known primarily for her screen-printed paintings of the province's landscape and roads. In 2011, she was longlisted for the Sobey Art Award, one of Canada's most prestigious contemporary art awards.

Career 
Greeley studied at the Cooper Union School for the Advancement of Art and Science in New York as part of an exchange program, graduating in 1996. She then graduated from the Nova Scotia College of Art and Design in 1997, where she majored in Painting and Drawing.

Greeley pursued a career as a contemporary artist in New York for five years, but found that her interests leaned towards the landscape. She returned to Newfoundland in 2003.

Her Newfoundland paintings evolved from her studies in abstraction while in New York, and portray contemporary Newfoundland subjects as unromantic, largely monochromatic representations that are abstracted from their original surroundings, textures and colors. She has described her paintings as "taken from a 'place' and made into a 'non-place'. ...  This 'non-place' than becomes a representation of my feelings or experiences."

Greeley's paintings have since been exhibited in Germany, Canada and the United States. In 2009, Greeley participated in a four month residency at The Rooms in St. John's, Newfoundland and Labrador, which led to a solo exhibition entitled "Time Trial." In 2013, her work was included in a major survey of painting in Canada titled "The Painting Project," organized by Galerie UQAM.

After the birth of twins in 2014, Greeley's subject matter shifted to interiors. This body of work was shown at The Rooms as part of the exhibition "All Day Within the Dreamy House" in 2016.

Greeley has also worked with Fogo Island Arts as a consultant, and has collaborated with fellow artist Erika Jane Stephens Moore on caribou-themed wallpaper for the Fogo Island Inn. The wallpaper was included in the exhibition "Folklore and Other Panics" at The Rooms in 2015.

Her work is included in the Canada Council Art Bank, The Rooms Provincial Art Gallery, the Art Gallery of Nova Scotia and the Newfoundland Provincial Art Bank Collection. She is currently represented by Christina Parker Gallery.

Exhibition history

Solo exhibitions 
2017 Erasure, Maison Des Arts, Laval, Quebec

2015 Chasing The Light, Christina Parker Gallery, St. John's, NL

2011     I Love You, A1C Gallery, St. John's, NL

2009 Time Trial, The Rooms Provincial Art Gallery, St. John's, NL

2009 Wish You Were Here, Christina Parker Gallery, St. John's, NL

2008     TCH, Eastern Edge Gallery, St. John's, NL

2008 Phendrana Drift, Resource Center for the Arts Gallery, St. John's, NL

2006     100 Paper Moths, Site specific installation, Anglican Cathedral Park, St. John's, NL

2006 Landing, 312 Online Videos, www.312.ca

2004 New Paintings, The Rogue Gallery, Eastern Edge Gallery, St. John's, NL

2003 Phendrana, elefan+shipfischerinsel, Berlin, Germany

1998 Paintings, Anna Leonowens Gallery, Halifax, NS

1998 Portraits, Eye Level Gallery. Halifax, NS

1997 Solo, Anna Leonowens Gallery, Halifax, NS

Group exhibitions 
2017 Time & Place, Christina Parker Gallery, St. John's, NL

2017 Geopoetics: Ranges of Motion, Curated by Kasia Basta. Stewart Hall Art Gallery, Pointe Claire, Quebec

2017   Imago Mundi, Curated by Francesca Valente.  Italy

2016    All Day Within the Dreamy House, Curated by Vicky Chainey Gagnon, The Rooms Provincial Art Gallery, St. John's, NL

2016 After Fields, Southern Graphics Council International: Flux Location, Portland, OR, USA

2015 Folklore And Other Panics, The Rooms Provincial Art Gallery, St. John's, NL

2014 Changing Tides: Contemporary Art in Newfoundland and Labrador, McMichael Gallery, Kleinburg, ON

2013 Into The Night, Art Gallery of Nova Scotia, NS

2013 The Painting Project, Galerie de l'UQAM, Montreal, Quebec

2012 25 for 25, The Rooms Provincial Art Gallery, St. John's, NL	

2012 25 for 25, Mary March Museum, Grand Falls, NL

2011 Limited Time Offer, The Rooms Provincial Art Gallery, St. John's, NL

2011 Atlanticus, Christina Parker Gallery, St. John's, NL

Art and Letters, The Rooms Provincial Art Gallery, St. John's, NL

Fogo Island Series, Christina Parker Gallery, St. John's, NL

2008 Forecast, Sir Wilfred Grenfell College Art Gallery, Corner Brook, NL	

2008 Rock and Roll: Selected Contemporary Art in Newfoundland, A1C Gallery, St. John's, NL

2008 Eastern Edge Video Series 2008, The Rooms Provincial Art Gallery, St. John's, NL

Further reading 
 Mireille Eagan, Kym Greeley and the New Newfoundland Painting, Canadian art magazine, August 2016
 Jennifer McVeigh, Folklore and Other Panics, Border Crossings Magazine, Vol. 34, Number 2. Spring 2015
 Craig Francis Power, Art World Antidote, Visual Arts News, Spring 2015
 Lizzy Hill, Folklore and Other Panics at The Rooms Provincial Art Gallery, national Gallery of Canada, Magazine. February 9, 2015
 Todd O'Brien , Folklore and Other Panics: Where folklore and Contemporary Art Meet, CBC. January 	2015
 Canadian Art, Folklore and Other Panics. 15 Shows We Want to See in 2015. December 2014
 Lizzy Hill, Rugged Nonconformity: The Art of Newfoundland and Labrador, National Gallery Magazine, February 2014
 The Painting Project, A Snapshot of Painting in Canada, Galerie De L'UQUAM, p. 64-67
 Bruce Johnson, Art Gallery of Nova Scotia Journal, Summer 2011
 Craig Francis Power, The 25 Greatest Works of Art Ever Made in Newfoundland and Labrador. The Scope, August 2009
 Gloria Hickey, Visual Arts News, February 10, 2009
 Angela Antle, CBC Radio, Interview, February 4, 2009
 Joan Sullivan, The Telegram, The road less traveled, February 6, 2009
 Mike Landry, Things of Desire, Kym Greeley: Time Trial, February 5, 2009
 Mix Magazine, v.31.1, 2006, p. 36-41
 Riddle Fence A Journal Of Arts and Culture v.2, 2008 pg.91
 Craig Francis Power, Landscape Painter, Current, 2006
 Craig Francis Power, Art In Newfoundland, 100 Paper Moths by Kym Greeley, August 07, 2006
 Craig Francis Power, Art In Newfoundland, Members One at Eastern Edge Gallery, December 7, 2005
 Cliff Eyland, Monitor Goo: Abstract Painting In The Age Of Video. Tea and Sympathy Plug In Cahier, 1998, pg.146-151.
 Jesse Simon, Minimalist shows spawn differing conclusions. Current exhibits at Plug In and Ace Art have much to say about emptiness and the gallery space. 1998

References

External links 
 Artist Website
 Christina Parker Gallery Website

Canadian painters
Living people
1973 births
20th-century Canadian artists
Artists from Newfoundland and Labrador
20th-century Canadian women artists